St. Peter Catholic High School is a Catholic high school located in Orléans, a suburb of Ottawa, Canada.  The current principal is Linda Meulenbroek.  The school includes grades 7–12 and also a preschool/daycare service. During the 2019–2020 school year, 525 intermediate (grades 7–8) and 1,235 high-school (grades 9–12) students were enrolled.

Academics

St. Peter Catholic High School offers courses within the curriculum provided by the Ontario Ministry of Education. Students are offered courses at different levels and streams. Grade 9–10 students can study in the academic or applied streams, and grade 11–12 students select their courses from the university, college, mixed, workplace or open levels, corresponding to what sort of post-secondary education they may wish to pursue. Students may also enroll in core-French and French-immersion courses, part of the province's French-as-a-second-language program.

St. Peter Catholic High School's academic programs include religious and family life education courses taught at all grade levels, English, health and physical education, the arts, history, geography, mathematics, science, business, and technology. Science programs include Biology, Physics, Phrenology, Animal Husbandry, Chemistry and Environmental Studies. Arts offered throughout the grades 9–12 include dramatic arts, visual arts (including photography), music (including instrumental, Australian traditional music, including didgeridoo, marimba, and guitar) and sacred dance. St. Peter is also suited for special needs and cooperative education. Courses are offered at the Open, Applied, Polish, and some Academic levels.

Sports

Grades 7-12 are all offered over 69 sports:
 Grade 7-8 boys'/girls' basketball, soccer, cross-country, volleyball, badminton, Quidditch, hockey
 Junior: boys' football, girls' basketball, field hockey, St. Peter Rugby
 Senior: boys' football, soccer, volleyball, senior rugby
 Girls' basketball, varsity girls' ice hockey
 Track and field, badminton, boys' ice hockey, golf, alpine skiing, rugby union and ultimate frisbee
 Girls'/boys' junior/intermediate Quidditch team

In 2005–2006, the Knights won city championships in junior boys' football, senior boys' football, senior girls' basketball, junior boys' soccer, senior boys' rugby and golf. Many of these teams repeated as champions in 2006–2007, which is well over ten years ago.  

St Peter's main sports rival is St. Matthew High School.

Annual events
St Pete's puts on two different plays every year, one by the grade 7 and 8 students and the other by the high school students. The high school's performance is often a musical. The high school musical is led by drama/music teacher Bernie Leger, who in 2012 won the Diamond Jubilee award for excellence and dedication in teaching. Past plays include Grease (2008), Beauty and the Beast (2009), Little Shop of Horrors (2010), Phantom of the Opera (2011), West Side Story (2012), Footloose (2013), Shrek: The Musical (2014), and Tarzan: The Stage Musical (2015). Tarzan was Leger's 20th play at the school. The plays always include several dance numbers with careful choreography, and have strong chorus singers. Some sets are made and painted by the school's art students. Performances are held during the last weekend of February, usually from Wednesday to Saturday.

St. Peter's show choir (Treble Threat) also used to perform annually at the local "choir fest," a gathering of numerous Christian choirs to sing and celebrate the Christmas season. The St Pete's choir is cherished for its dedication and youthfulness, and is often given a standing ovation. The choir also has many other annual events, formerly including the Show Choir Canada Competition held at the Sony Center in Toronto. In 2012, St Pete's performed and won a national bronze medal, only losing to choirs from two of the audition-based performing art schools located in Toronto.

For four years, up to 2017, in June, the St. Peter's Grade 12 graduating class had their commencement at the Ottawa Convention Centre (Shaw Centre). Since then, the ceremonies have been held at the EY Centre, a purpose-built convention centre.

Location 
The high school is located on Charlemagne Boulevard in the community of Fallingbrook in Orléans, Ontario. Construction began in 1991 and the school was completed for the 1992–1993 academic year. As the student population grew, portable classrooms were set up in the lot behind the main building. A new wing was constructed and opened in 2005, replacing a number of these classrooms.

The school is served by OC Transpo routes 35 and 131.

Notable alumni 

Eli Ankou – NFL player
 Corey Charron – rapper and starred on MTV Wild N Out
Cody Ceci – NHL hockey player
Keshia Chanté – singer
Kira Isabella – singer 
Jonathan Matsumoto – NHL hockey player
Anthony Stewart – NHL hockey player
Dax - Rapper

See also
List of high schools in Ontario
Ottawa Carleton Catholic School Board

References

150 years of Catholic Education in Ottawa-Carleton 1856-2006, Ottawa-Carleton Catholic School Board, 2006

External links
 Ottawa Catholic School Board
 St. Peter Catholic High School website

Catholic secondary schools in Ontario
High schools in Ottawa
Educational institutions established in 1992
1992 establishments in Ontario
Middle schools in Ottawa